The 1942 Colorado gubernatorial election was held on November 3, 1942. Republican nominee John Charles Vivian defeated Democratic nominee Homer Bedford with 56.23% of the vote.

Primary elections
Primary elections were held on September 8, 1942.

Democratic primary

Candidates
Homer Bedford, Colorado State Treasurer
Moses E. Smith, State Representative
William Lee Knous, Justice of the Colorado Supreme Court

Results

Republican primary

Candidates
John Charles Vivian, incumbent Lieutenant Governor
Charles M. Armstrong, former Secretary of State of Colorado

Results

General election

Candidates
Major party candidates
John Charles Vivian, Republican
Homer Bedford, Democratic

Other candidates
William R. Dietrich, Communist

Results

References

1942
Colorado
Gubernatorial